Ivanković is a South Slavic surname, derived from the male given name Ivanko. Notable people with the surname include:

Antun Ivanković (born 1939), Croatian rower
Branko Ivanković (born 1954), Croatian football manager
Ivanka Ivanković (born 1966), witness to alleged apparitions
Jerko Ivanković Lijanović (born 1969), Bosnian politician
Jure Ivanković (born 1985), Bosnian football manager
Krešimir Ivanković (born 1977), Croatian handballer
Luca Ivanković (born 1987), Croatian basketballer
Mario Ivanković (born 1975), Bosnian and Croatian football manager
Mladen Ivanković-Lijanović (born 1960), Bosnian politician
Nenad Ivanković (born 1948), Croatian journalist
Nives Ivanković (born 1967), Croatian actress
Vedran Ivanković (born 1983), Croatian footballer
Vicka Ivanković (born 1964), witness to alleged apparitions
Zlatko Ivanković (born 1952), Croatian football manager
Željko Ivanković (born 1954), Croatian writer

See also
Ivanović
Jovanković
Janković

Croatian surnames
Serbian surnames

he:איוואנוב
pl:Ivanković